In logic, anti-psychologism (also logical objectivism or logical realism) is a theory about the nature of logical truth, that it does not depend upon the contents of human ideas but exists independent of human ideas.

Overview
The anti-psychologistic treatment of logic originated in the works of Immanuel Kant and Bernard Bolzano.

The concept of logical objectivism or anti-psychologism was further developed by Johannes Rehmke (founder of Greifswald objectivism) and Gottlob Frege (founder of logicism the most famous anti-psychologist in the philosophy of mathematics), and has been the centre of an important debate in early phenomenology and analytical philosophy. Frege's work was influenced by Bolzano.

Elements of anti-psychologism in the historiography of philosophy can be found in the work of the members of the 1830s speculative theist movement and the late work of Hermann Lotze.

The psychologism dispute in 19th-century German-speaking philosophy is closely related to the contemporary internalism and externalism debate in epistemology; psychologism is often construed as a kind of internalism (the thesis that no fact about the world can provide reasons for action independently of desires and beliefs) and anti-psychologism as a kind of externalism (the thesis that reasons are to be identified with objective features of the world).

Psychologism was defended by Theodor Lipps, Gerardus Heymans, Wilhelm Wundt, Wilhelm Jerusalem, Christoph von Sigwart, Theodor Elsenhans, and Benno Erdmann.

Edmund Husserl was another important proponent of anti-psychologism, and this trait passed on to other phenomenologists, such as Martin Heidegger, whose doctoral thesis was meant to be a refutation of psychologism. They shared the argument that, because the proposition "no-p is a not-p" is not logically equivalent to "It is thought that 'no-p is a not-p'", psychologism does not logically stand.

Charles Sanders Peirce—whose fields included logic, philosophy, and experimental psychology—could also be considered a critic of psychologism in logic.

The return of psychologism

Psychologism is not widely held amongst logicians today, but something like it has some high-profile defenders especially among those who do research at the intersection of logic and cognitive science, for example Dov Gabbay and John Woods, who concluded that "whereas mathematical logic must eschew psychologism, the new logic cannot do without it".

Notes

Further reading 
 Vladimir Bryushinkin. Metapsychologism in the Philosophy of Logic. Proc. Logic and Philosophy of Logic, 20th World Congress in Philosophy, 2000.
 Martin Kusch. Psychologism: A Case Study in the Sociology of Philosophical Knowledge. London and New York: Routledge, 1995.

Theories of deduction